Justice Holman may refer to:

James Holman (judge), judge of the High Court of England and Wales
Jesse Lynch Holman, one of the first three justices of the Supreme Court of Indiana
Lawrence Holman, associate justice of the Supreme Court of Missouri
Ralph M. Holman, associate justice of the Oregon Supreme Court